Canelita Medina is a Venezuelan salsa singer noted for singing in the Cuban Son style. She had always dreamt of becoming a singer as a young girl, imitating the salsa singer Celia Cruz. When she entered a radio talent program on Radio Continente, she caught the attention of talent agents with her unique voice. Over the years, Canelita has achieved great success, both nationally and internationally, and is successful to this day. Through more than 50 years of her life as an artist, Canelita Medina has received many awards.

Her daughter, Trina Medina, has also had a notable career in music as a soloist and music writer for the 2007 Venezuelan film, Una abuela virgen. (see her biography in Spanish.) In The Book of Salsa, Rondón states, "it is impossible to overlook the contributions of Canelita and her daughter, Trina Medina, each with her own distinct, yet connected style."

Biography 
Canelita Medina, whose real name is Rogelia Medina, was born in the port of La Guaira on March 6, 1939, and is seen as one of the greatest symbols of the "Son Montuno." She is a source of national pride for Venezuela and their 'living legend,' recently celebrating fifty years of life as an artist with a CD collection. She is considered one of the most versatile voices in Venezuela to sing music such as Son, the Guajira, the rhythmic Montuno and Bolero. She demonstrated an aptitude for singing since childhood. Her musical career began on a professional level in 1957 with the act "Sonora Caracas," with whom she remained for seven years and made her first recording "Canelita." She also joined "Los megatones de Lucho" and "Los Caribes" by Victor Piñero, after her performance alongside the "Estrellas Latinas" of La Guaira. Canelita took a break from the performances for a period of eight years, until joining Federico Betancourt in "Federico y su Combo Latino" and recording her first hit, "Besos brujos." She was the unique singer woman in the orchestra  along with El Negrito Calavén, Carlín Rodríguez, El Bobby, Joe Ruiz, Orlando Watussi, Wladimir Lozano, Dimas Pedroza, Manny Bolaños and others. However, her talent became well known after she decided to go solo, recording the legendary album Sones y Guajira, a classic of Venezuelan discography. The album included "Rosa roja," "Yo no escondo a mi abuelita" and "Eso no es ná," among others. She then recorded albums which highlight her great success, such as Quiéreme, Noche triunfal and Canto a La Guairá, among others, until she became involved with El Sonero Clásico del Caribe, with whom she recorded two albums, from which two songs "Tanto y tanto" and "Ta ta Candela" became international hits.

After several years, Canelita formed her own group, with whom she performed many times. The popular Venezuelan singer alternated concerts among internationally recognised performers with various groups such as Orquesta América, La Aragón, Sonora Matancera, El Gran Combo de Puerto Rico, Los Hermanos Lebrón, Estrellas de Fania, Richy Ray and Bobby Cruz, Sonora Ponceña, Johnny Pacheco, Celia Cruz, Oscar D'León and José Mangual Jr.
She performed solo in many Venezuelan cities, as well as in various different countries, including Peru, Colombia, Costa Rica, Curacao, Aruba, United States, Mexico and Cuba.

She attended many festivals as a special guest, in particular the International Salsa Festival held in the Teatro Teresa Carreño, and the Benny Moré Festival and the Son Festival, held in Santiago, Cuba and Curacao, respectively. In recent years she has worked with Andy Durán in countless presentations at national and international levels, and in various concerts at the UCV Aula Magna, paying homage to the greats of Latin music La noche de Los Titos (Tito Rodriguez and Tito Puente), Fania All-Stars and Celia Cruz, from which she released the live album Canelita and Andy Duran's tribute concert for Celia Cruz.

She was also a special guest at the Oscar D'Leon concert held in the Aula Magna UCV, celebrating 50 years with the Orquesta Sinfónica Municipal de Caracas, as well as at a tribute to Alfredo Sadel held in the Las Mercedes Square performed by the Orquesta Sinfónica Gran Mariscal de Ayacucho.

Latest album 

In 2008, she received the Orden Carlos Soublette recognition award from the Vargas state government. She then produced a CD collection including "Besos brujos," "El que se va no hace falta," "Tanto y tanto," "Quiéreme," "Besos salvajes," "Yo no escondo a mi abuelita," "El cangrejo no tiene ná," "La ruñidera," "Soy Canela," "El son de mi nación," "Rosas rojas," "La alborada," "Una noche de Francia" and "Coco Seco."

Discography 
Canelita made a total of 26 albums, the most popular of which are listed below.

References

External links 
 Official Facebook page of CanelitaMedina. (Spanish)
 Official channel on YouTube Canelita Medina (Spanish)
 Profile in french, including photos
 Magazine article

1939 births
Living people
20th-century Venezuelan women singers